Conewago Township may refer to:

Conewago Township, Adams County, Pennsylvania
Conewago Township, Dauphin County, Pennsylvania
Conewago Township, York County, Pennsylvania

See also
Conewango Township, Warren County, Pennsylvania

Pennsylvania township disambiguation pages